A resort island (French Île-hôtel; "hotel island") is a hotel complex located on an island; in many cases one luxury hotel may own the entire island. More broadly, resort island can be defined as any island or an archipelago that contains resorts, hotels, overwater bungalows, restaurants, tourist attractions and its amenities, and might offer all-inclusive accommodations. It primary focus on tourism services and offer leisure, adventure, and amusement opportunities.

Resort island is often confused or identified with island resort, which is a resort located on an island. Island resort is almost the same with seaside resort or beach resort, which offers beaches and water sport activities, such as sunbathing, swimming, snorkeling, scuba diving and surfing, the only difference is that seaside resorts might located on the continent's seaside, while island resorts must be located on an island or archipelago.

Resort islands mostly rely on their natural environment to attract visitors, such as beaches, biodiversity of coral reefs and forest, or secluded and private locations. Others might rely on their man-made built attractions, such as spas, amusement parks, casinos or nightlife.

On the one hand, the development of a small island into a resort often entails serious environmental degradation (reef digging, sewage, sand pumping...); on the other, a resort island complex can provide shelter for heavily poached species, as resorts own security services that no marine protected area can afford.

Resort islands around the world

Australia 
Bedarra Island
Brampton Island
Daydream Island
Dunk Island
Fitzroy Island (Queensland)
Great Keppel Island
Green Island (Queensland)
Haggerstone Island
Hamilton Island (Queensland)
Hayman Island
Hinchinbrook Island
Lindeman Island
Lizard Island
Long Island (Whitsunday Islands)
South Molle Island

China 
Hainan

France 
Corsica

French Polynesia 
Bora Bora
Moorea
Tahiti

Greece 
Mykonos
Santorini
Crete

India 
Bangaram Island

Indonesia 
Bali
Lombok
Gili Islands
Bintan Island resort
Saronde Island
Moyo Island resort
Wakatobi

Iran 
 Kish

Italy
Capri
Sicily
Sardinia

Japan 
Okinawa Islands

Korea 
Jeju

Malaysia 
Langkawi
Sabah

Mexico 
Cozumel
Isla Mujeres
Holbox

Mozambique 
Vamizi Island
Bazaruto Archipelago

Philippines 
 Amanpulo
 Balesin Island Club
 Boracay
 Coron
 Mactan
 Siargao

Portugal 
Madeira

Singapore 
Sentosa Island

Spain 
Ibiza
Mallorca
Canary Islands

Taiwan 
Penghu Islands

Tanzania 
Zanzibar

Thailand 
Ko Samui
Phuket

United States 
Hawaii
Washington Island (Wisconsin)

Vietnam 
Phu Quoc

References

External links 
List of top 10 islands according to categories

 
Island